is a railway station in Nishi-ku, Hamamatsu, Shizuoka Prefecture, Japan, operated by the Central Japan Railway Company (JR Tōkai ).

Lines

Station layout
Bentenjima Station has a single island platform serving Track 1 and Track 2. The platforms are unusually wide, and the station building is located underneath the platforms. The station is staffed.

Platforms

Adjacent stations

|-
!colspan=5|Central Japan Railway Company

Station history
Bentenjima Station was opened on July 11, 1906 when the section of the Tōkaidō Main Line connecting Hamamatsu Station with Ōbu Station was completed. It was originally a seasonal station, open only during the summer months for visitors to the nearby beach resorts. It became a permanent station on September 1, 1916. Regularly scheduled freight service was discontinued in 1971.

Station numbering was introduced to the section of the Tōkaidō Line operated JR Central in March 2018; Bentenjima Station was assigned station number CA37.

Passenger statistics
In fiscal 2017, the station was used by an average of 792 passengers daily (boarding passengers only).

Surrounding area
Japan National Route 1

See also
 List of Railway Stations in Japan

References

Yoshikawa, Fumio. Tokaido-sen 130-nen no ayumi. Grand-Prix Publishing (2002) .

External links

Stations of Central Japan Railway Company
Tōkaidō Main Line
Railway stations in Japan opened in 1906
Railway stations in Shizuoka Prefecture
Railway stations in Hamamatsu